Sir John Ross Stainton CBE (27 May 1914 - 5 December 2011) was a British businessman, and a former chief executive of British Airways and BOAC in the 1970s.

Early life
He attended independent school in Worcestershire.

Career

Imperial Airways
He joined Imperial Airways in 1933.

Royal Air Force
He served in the Royal Air Force from 1940.

BOAC
He joined BOAC.

British Airways
BOAC became British Airways in 1974.

Personal life
He married in 1933; his wife died in 2001. He had three daughters. He was awarded the CBE in the 1971 Birthday Honours. He was knighted in the 1981 New Year Honours. He lived in Camberley, off the B311.

References

External links
 Telegraph obituary

1914 births
2011 deaths
British airline chief executives
British Airways people
Commanders of the Order of the British Empire
Imperial Airways
Knights Bachelor
People from Camberley
People of the British Overseas Airways Corporation